Peter Buckley may refer to:

 Peter Buckley (boxer) (born 1969), English journeyman welterweight boxer
 Peter J. Buckley (born 1957), Oregon State Representative, District 5 (2004–present)
 Peter Buckley (cyclist) (1944–1969), British professional racing cyclist
 Peter Buckley (academic) (born 1949), British professor of multinational enterprise and international business
 Peter F. Buckley, psychiatrist